Manuleopsis is a monotypic genus of flowering plants belonging to the family Scrophulariaceae. The only species is Manuleopsis dinteri.

Its native range is Namibia.

References

Scrophulariaceae
Scrophulariaceae genera
Monotypic Lamiales genera